Jalan Ulu Jempol, Federal Route 1531 is the main federal roads in Bandar Pusat Jengka, Pahang, Malaysia.

At most sections, the Federal Route 1531 was built under the JKR R5 road standard, allowing maximum speed limit of up to 90 km/h.

List of junctions and towns 

Malaysian Federal Roads